Rafael Nadal was the defending champion, but did not participate this year.

Luis Horna won the title, defeating Juan Ignacio Chela 7–6(7–5), 6–4 in the final.

Seeds

  Guillermo Coria (first round)
  Gastón Gaudio (semifinals)
  Carlos Moyá (second round)
  Filippo Volandri (first round)
  José Acasuso (second round, retired because of a right foot injury)
  Florent Serra (first round)
  Juan Ignacio Chela (final)
  Nicolás Massú (second round)

Draw

Finals

Section 1

Section 2

External links
Men's Singles draw
Men's Qualifying draw

2006 Abierto Mexicano Telcel
Abierto Mexicano Telcel